The 1990 Family Circle Cup was a women's tennis tournament played on outdoor clay courts at the Sea Pines Plantation on Hilton Head Island, South Carolina in the United States and was part of Tier I of the 1990 WTA Tour. It was the 18th edition of the tournament and ran from April 2 through April 8, 1990. First-seeded Martina Navratilova won the singles title, her fourth at the event.

Finals

Singles

 Martina Navratilova defeated  Jennifer Capriati 6–2, 6–4
 It was Navratilova's 4th singles title of the year and the 150th of her career.

Doubles

 Martina Navratilova /  Arantxa Sánchez Vicario defeated  Mercedes Paz /  Natasha Zvereva 6–2, 6–1
 It was Navratilova's 3rd doubles title of the year and the 153rd of her career. It was Sánchez Vicario's 1st doubles title of the year and the 2nd of her career.

References

External links
 Official website
 ITF tournament edition details
 1990 Main Draw

Family Circle Cup
Charleston Open
Family Circle Cup
Family Circle Cup
Family Circle Cup